There are two windmills standing today in Reigate. They are:-

Reigate Heath Windmill.
Wray Common Mill.